A Division Bench is a term in judicial system in India in which a case is heard and judged by at least 2 judges. However, if the bench during the hearing of any matter   feels that the matter needs to be considered by a larger bench, such a matter is referred to a larger bench.

References 

Judiciary of India